Colobodontidae is an extinct family of marine stem-neopterygian fish known from the Middle to Late Triassic of Asia and Europe. As currently defined, it contains three genera: Colobodus, Crenilepis and Feroxichthys. The colobodontids were medium-sized, somewhat deep-bodied fishes with a durophagous diet. Like many other stem-neopterygians, they have traditionally been placed in the order Perleidiformes, which is now thought to be paraphyletic.

Classification 
The cladogram below follows Ma et al. (2021) and shows the relationships between Colobodontidae and other neopterygian clades:

References 

Prehistoric neopterygii
Prehistoric ray-finned fish families